The white-barred wrasse (Pseudocheilinus ocellatus), also known as the white-barred pink wrasse, is a species of marine ray-finned fish, a wrasse from the family Labridae This wrasse is native to the central western Pacific Ocean from Japan to the Coral Sea. It can also be found, under the trade name "mystery wrasse", in the aquarium trade.

References

White-barred wrasse
Fish described in 1999